Norway competed at the 1984 Winter Paralympics held in Innsbruck, Austria. In total athletes representing Norway won 15 gold medals, 13 silver medals and 13 bronze medals and the country finished in 3rd place in the medal table.

Cross-country skiing 

Competitors representing Norway won six gold medals, three silver medals and two bronze medals.

Ice sledge speed racing 

Competitors representing Norway won nine gold medals, 10 silver medals and 11 bronze medals.

See also 
 Norway at the Paralympics
 Norway at the 1984 Summer Paralympics

References 

Norway at the Paralympics
1984 in Norwegian sport
Nations at the 1984 Winter Paralympics